Joshua Mostel (born December 21, 1946) is an American actor with numerous film and Broadway credits. The son of Zero Mostel, he is best known for his supporting roles in films such as Jesus Christ Superstar (1973), Harry and Tonto (1974), Sophie's Choice (1982), City Slickers (1991), Billy Madison (1995), and Big Daddy (1999).

Life and career
Mostel was born in New York City, the son of Kathryn Celia (née Harken), an actress, dancer, and writer, and comic actor Zero Mostel. His brother Tobias is a painter, ceramic artist and professor of art, teaching at Florida State University and Tallahassee Community College.

Mostel started his career as a boy soprano at the Metropolitan Opera in New York. He graduated from Brandeis University. His Broadway debut was in 1971 with Unlikely Heroes. In 1973, Mostel had one of his more notable film performances as Herod in Jesus Christ Superstar. In 1979, Mostel briefly starred in Delta House, the television version of the film Animal House; he played Blotto Blutarsky, the brother of the character Bluto (played by John Belushi in the original film).

On Broadway, he appeared in the 1989 revival of The Threepenny Opera as Money Matthew and as the frazzled head writer in the original 1992 production of My Favorite Year.
He also played the part of "the best trader on the street", Ollie,  one of Gordon Gekko's traders in Wall Street.

Mostel lives in New York, with a summer home in Monhegan, Maine.

Filmography

Broadway productions

References

External links
 

1947 births
American male film actors
American male stage actors
American male musical theatre actors
Brandeis University alumni
Disney people
Marvel Comics people
Male actors from New York City
Living people
American people of Austrian-Jewish descent
American people of German-Jewish descent
American people of Mountain Jewish descent
American people of Polish-Jewish descent
American people of Russian-Jewish descent
American people of Romanian-Jewish descent
American people of Swiss-Jewish descent
American people of Arbëreshë descent
American people of Corsican descent
American people of French descent
American people of Italian descent
American people of Israeli descent
Male actors from Beverly Hills, California
Male actors from Los Angeles
Comedians from California
Film directors from Los Angeles
Screenwriters from California